Helen Lawrence, whose grandparents came from Russia, was born in London and studied at the Royal Academy of Music and in Italy. Therefore, Helen's training is linked directly to the great Italian bel canto tradition.

She divided her career with equal success between the operatic stage and the concert platform and was an accomplished recitalist.

Operatic career

"A singer of unusual intelligence" – The Times, 1968
Hailed by the critics as a singer "of unusual intelligence with real command of a big soprano range and quite exceptional gifts of coloring and characterization" (The Times), at her recital debut in 1968 at the Wigmore Hall, her debut at Covent Garden with Georg Solti followed, and she was immediately offered several principal guest roles. However, her career progress was unexpectedly halted by problems relating to the birth of her daughter in 1970.

Setbacks overcome
She overcame these and, with  a series of landmark opera performances intended to put her career back on track, again received outstanding critical acclaim. William Mann of The Times described her singing of the title role in Donizetti's Lucrezia Borgia in 1977 as "brilliant, musicianly and grandly expressive".

But a further setback forced her to change course just as new offers began to arrive, including a  return to Covent Garden in the role of First Lady in Die Zauberflöte.  Her voice was changing and a switch to the mezzo-soprano repertoire was indicated. The effect of these two major setbacks meant that Helen never became more widely known. But the quality of her work over a period of forty years was never in doubt as evidenced by the unusually lavish praise that consistently greeted her performances, from her student days in the early 1960s onwards, whether as soprano or mezzo. In 1983 the Financial Times asked: "Why do we not hear more of this bold and interesting singer?"

Wide-ranging and eclectic repertoire
A particular feature of her work was her wide-ranging and eclectic repertoire. Gifted with a voice of immense range and power combined with agility, she was able to tackle repertoire as diverse as the great dramatic Verdi roles, the verismo and bel canto repertoire, Wagner, Strauss and Mozart and then switch to the mezzo repertoire.  She particularly focused on unusual or neglected repertoire. Her performance of Cherubini's Médée,  the first complete performance in London of the original uncut French score in 1979 was described in Music and Musicians as a “long-overdue return to authenticity” that “wrought the same kind of revelation as is experienced when centuries of grime are swept off the canvas of an old master”.   Her performance of Giordano's Fedora was also broadcast by the BBC.

Similarly, as a recitalist, she explored the fabulous repertoire of Latin American songs - still rarely heard – giving a broadcast, with Malcolm Martineau, on Radio 3. One of her last recitals was of Russian song-settings of Pushkin, devised for the British Pushkin Bicentennial Trust, given at Kenwood House in 1999, with Paul Hamburger.

Championing new music
Lawrence has also given many first performances of contemporary music, working with composers such as the late John Tavener and David Lumsdaine. Her reminiscence of working with John when they were students together was published in The Times. In the 1980s she was associated with the revival of interest in the music of the late Berthold Goldschmidt giving the world premiere, in the title role, of his 1951 opera Beatrice Cenci, in a concert performance at Queen Elizabeth Hall, broadcast by Radio 3 and filmed by BBC2 TV. Also broadcast on BBC Radio 3 was her performance of Ginastera's Cantata para America Magica.

Her switch to mezzo repertoire proved successful and, in the last years of her performing career, she greatly enjoyed revisiting many of the operas in which she had previously taken the soprano lead, and seeing them from a new angle.

Activism
Since retiring Helen has devoted her time to arts promotion, music criticism, writing and voluntary activity in the community. She was Vice Chair of the InterChange Trust, which saved Hampstead Town Hall from demolition by Camden Council, with a £10 million Lottery funded project to restore the Hall for arts and community use. It was opened by Prince Charles in 2000.  She ran the Hampstead and Highgate Festival for five years from 2003, was a trustee of London Opera Players, and served on the Royal Academy of Music's Development Committee. For five years she reviewed Opera in London for the local Camden newspaper, the Camden New Journal.

Other arts projects with which she has been involved are London Masterclasses  (co-founder and joint artistic director of with the pianist Norma Fisher, 1988- 1992); and Artistic director and administrator for the New Shakespeare Company's one-off opera season at the Open Air Theatre, Regent's Park, in 1983.

Publications
These include  translations from Italian to English for Hamlyn; a history of the Camden Festival: Music, Art & Politics; a History of the St. Pancras and Camden Festivals (2004), published by the Camden History Society; and a booklet about Elgar's Hampstead connections.

She is currently working on a history of how Hampstead Heath was saved for the public. Her 2014 illustrated lecture in preparation for the book was videoed by David Percy and can be seen at. ...  She is now working on a further installment of the story for Camden History Society next Year.
 
"Offers virtues absent from many a singer on the international scene" – BBC Music Magazine, January 2001

Recordings
Her last recital, of Russian song-settings of Pushkin, was released on the Beulah label in 2000 as a double CD album together with a re-issue of a 1979 recital of soprano operatic arias, entitled Portrait of an Artist.

http://www.amazon.co.uk/CDs-Vinyl-Helen-Lawrence/s?ie=UTF8&page=1&rh=n%3A229816%2Cp_32%3AHelen%20Lawrence
"Helen Lawrence - Portrait of an Artist - Verdi, Puccini, etc CD", CD Universe

References

Year of birth missing (living people)
Living people
20th-century British women opera singers
Alumni of the Royal Academy of Music